The following songs were produced by Fatgums.

2000

Fatgums and Gammaray - OHHSSH!! 
 "Ha!" (co-produced by Gammaray)
 "Skooby" (co-produced by Gammaray)

2005

The Committee - The Committee EP
 "Struggles"

2008

Novelists - Bookends
 01. "Book Begins" (co-produced by Gammaray)
 02. "Crime In The City" (co-produced by Gammaray)
 03. "Morning"
 04. "Treats" (co-produced by Gammaray)
 08. "Never There"
 10. "Smokin'"
 11. "Novel Scratching (feat. DJ ET, and DJ Tanner)"
 12. "Yes Yes Yes"
 13. "My Only Vice Remix"
 14. "Murderous Rage"

Bambu - ...Exact Change...
 01. "Make Change"
 08. "Seven Months"
 14. "Exact Change"
 15. "Iron Bam" (co-produced by Bambu)

The CounterParts - Appetizer
 03. "Luv What We Do"
 04. "Blind"
 05. "Breaking Point"
 06. "The Hold Up"
 07. "Re:Action"
 08. "Guns of Wilmas (feat. Bambu)"
 10. "Dream Deferred" (co-produced by Gammaray)

ReVision - Forward Progress Mixtape 
 01. "Forward Progress feat. DJ Krissfader"
 09. "Daily Grind feat. C-Los"

2009

Beatrock Presents: Fatgums x Bambu - ...A Peaceful Riot...
 01. "Intro"
 02. "Peddlin' Music"
 03. "Strapped"  
 04. "Good Clothes"
 05. "Listen"
 06. "Words from JOMA/Words from TINO (feat. T-Know)"
 07. "Gunslinger I"
 08. "Gunslinger II"
 09. "Won't Walk Away" (co-produced by Gammaray)

The CounterParts - The CounterParts LP
 01. "Blast Off"
 04. "What We Do"
 06. "Guns of Cali (feat. Native Guns)"
 10. "Re:Act"
 14. "Until"

DJ Phatrick - A Song For Ourselves Mixtape 
 15. "Divide & Conquer (Fatgums Remix ft. Geologic, Kiwi, & Bambu)"

2010

Rocky Rivera - Rocky Rivera 
 04. "The Rundown"

Bambu - ...Paper Cuts... 
 05. "The Queen Is Dead"

Power Struggle - Remittances
 01. "Air Out My Lungs"
 02. "Traveling Man"
 05. "What Goes Up" (co-produced by Mister REY)
 06. "Three Basic Problems (feat. Kiwi, Mister REY, BWAN, and Saico)" (co-produced by Mister REY)
 07. "Inspired By Dream"
 08. "Wash It Away (feat. ET)"
 09. "Sunshine (feat. Bambu, Pele, and Tina Shauf)" (co-produced by Mister REY)
 10. "Blood of My Heart (feat. Denizen Kane and Big Drew)"
 12. "Kill The Vultures"

Fatgums - Gumstrumentals Volume I

2011

Bambu - ...exact change...Reloaded 
 Disc 1 01. "Make Change"
 Disc 1 08. "Seven Months"
 Disc 1 14. "Exact Change"
 Disc 1 15. "Iron Bam" (co-produced by Bambu)
 Disc 2 08. "Jonah's Lament"

Dregs One - The Wake Up Call Mixtape 
 04. "Think About It"

Prometheus Brown and Bambu - Walk Into A Bar 
 08. "Lookin' Up"

Otayo Dubb - Cold Piece of Work 
 01. "Jerry McGuire"
 09. "A Lil' More (feat. Bambu)"

2012

Bwan - Living Room 
 02. "Infinite"
 05. "Grindstone"
 06. "Lyricists (feat. Akil)"

2013

Patience - Broken Hourglass 
 8. "City Love"

Bambu - Sun Of A Gun 
 15. "Sun In A Million"

Rocky Rivera - Gangster of Love 
 10. "Air Mail"

2014

Power Struggle - In Your Hands 
 4. "A Round For My Friends"
 5. "Live That Life"
 6. "Falling From The Sky"

2015

Rocky Rivera - Nom de Guerre 
 2. "Godsteppin"
 5. "Turn You"

Production discographies
Discographies of American artists
Hip hop discographies